Asian Paints Sharad Shamman is an excellence award given to the best decorated Durga Puja Pandal in Kolkata during the festival in October. Since its inception in 1985, Asian Paints Sharad Shamman has been heralded as the true achievement for excellence in decorating the abodes for Goddess Durga. As time has progressed there have been numerous awards being given by many other companies for creative excellence, but still Asian Paints Sharad Shamman is considered the most important award and the rightful judgement for excellence. It is a trendsetter for all the later awards.

About the Award
"Asian Paints Sharad Shamman" was started in 1985 as a means for awarding the best decorated puja pandal during Durga Puja in Kolkata. Sharad means "Autumn (as the festival takes place at that season)" and Shamman means "Award/Respect", and was sponsored by Asian Paints, hence the name Asian Paints Sharad Shamman. Out of about 3000 puja pandals in Kolkata, few get shortlisted and among them six are given the awards.

Award Categories
Total six awards are given to six puja pandals. When Sharad Shamman started in 1985 only three awards were given to three Best Puja pandals. From 1994 a special award called "Discovery of the Year" was introduced to honour a completely unknown pandal for its excellence. This four categories were continued for the next six years. But in 2000 Asian Paints felt the awards were too similar, there was no demarcation to identify Best Decoration of the pandal or the Best looking Idol. Hence in 2000 two new categories were introduced - "Creative Excellence (Nobbo Nakshi)", which focussed on the Best decorated Pandal, and "Best Artisan", given to the artist of the Best looking Idol. In 2010, the "Creative Excellence" was renamed to "Innovative Excellence" and it was continued for five years. Although in 2015, the Asian Paints committee didn't pick any puja for "Innovative Excellence" but the number of awards remained unaltered by introducing one more puja in "Discovery of the year" category. Keeping in mind the large growth and globalization in Kolkata Durga Puja, Asian Paints committee introduced another special award namely "Special Jury Award" on overall excellence. At present these seven categories (three for Best Pujas, two for Discovery of the year, one for Best Artisan and one for Special Award) represent Asian Paints Sharad Shamman. Some of the parameters for awarding the pandals include the overall beauty and grandeur of a pandal based on a chosen theme, the beauty of the Durga protima, how well the sanctum of the protima has been shown, and the finesse in the work done on the pandal. In 2020, due to nationwide COVID-19 pandemic, the Asian Paints Sharad Shamman judges didn't make a physical appearance on the participating pandels, the whole process had been successfully organised online by the APSS committee.

Best Puja (Shrestho Pujo)
years active (1985–present)

This award was the first award given when APSS started in 1985. Three puja pandals are selected based on everything, i.e., Decorative excellence, best looking idol, ambiance, lighting etc. No demarcations are there like winner, first runner-up: instead all three pujas are considered to be the Best Puja. Normally winners in these category used to be the well-known Pujas, but nowadays many unknown Pujas have cropped up with the technical excellence to bag this award. At present, Durga Pujas in Kolkata are more theme oriented. Some specific theme like Madhubani art or earthen cups or a place like Kerala, will be the base for the decoration. In 2001, "Bosepukur Sitalamandir" decorated its pandal completely of earthen cups and was so popular that it won the Best Puja award hands down. There have been many Pujas which has won this award many times. "Adi Ballygunge" leads the list with five wins. A puja, once been declared a winner in this list cannot be declared in the "Discovery of the Year" award though it can win "Creative Excellence" or "Best Artisan" award.

Among the asian paints sharad samman winners (see the above list "Most wins") "Laketown Natunpally Pradeep Sangha" is the first puja committee who had win the prestigious durga puja award (Best Puja or, Shrestho Pujo) for consecutive three years (2006, 2007 and 2008) for the first time in North Kolkata and for the second time in Kolkata after Adi Ballygunge. In 2019, another puja from North Kolkata namely "Talapark Pratyay" also achieved this unique record after "Natunpally Pradeep Sangha". Till date "Suruchi Sangha", "Naktala Udayan Sangha" and "Behala Natun Dal" had also achieved the award for three consecutive years.

Discovery of the Year (Bochorer Bismoy)
years active (1994–present)
Discovery of the Year was first introduced in 1994 as a means to introduce a previously unknown and undiscovered Puja Pandal. Many unknown Pujas have cropped up on this list which are extremely popular in Kolkata. Notable among them are Barisha Sahajatri, Karbagan, Shivmandir Sarbojanin etc. Laketown Netaji Sporting Club modeled their pandal totally on a village situated on a hill and won this award in 2003. It has also happened many times that a Puja Pandal has already been popular in Kolkata in the previous year, but wins the "Discovery" award next year. In that case logically that is not a "Discovery of the Year". A Puja, once winning this title, can't win it again.
Rammohan Sammilani won the discovery of the year in 1994.

Creative Excellence (Nobbo Nakshi)
years active (2000–present)
Started in 2000, Creative Excellence or Nobbo Nakshi in Bengali, is given as a means to felicitate the pandal with the best decoration. Pandals which has won the "Best Puja" and the "Discovery of the Year" can also win this award. "Darpanarayan Tagore Street" decorated their pandal entirely out of cowdung, which won them the first "Creative Excellence" award in 2001. Puja clubs can win this award anytime irrespective of whether they are a previously unknown puja or a famous one. Judges look for the intricacies and the details woven into creating the concept truly, and depicting them with technical brilliance.

Best Artisan (Shrestho Protimashilpi)

years active (2000–present)
Introduced in 2000, Best Artisan award is given to the maker of the Best Idol. Judges look for beauty, peace, strength, prowess in the idol and how good the idol can blend with the theme for the puja. Notable among the winners are Sanatan Dinda who has won 3 Best Artisan award, one for "Hatibagan Sarbojanin" in 2000 and two for "Nalin Sarkar Street" in 2004 and 2006, Shri Pradip Rudra Paul who won 2 awards for "Behala Adarshapally", Shri Purnendu Dey who won two awards, one for "Chakraberia Sarbojanin" in 2007 and for "Barisha Club" in 2008, Shri Subrata Banerjee who won two awards for "Tala Barowari" in 2015 and 2016 and Mr. Bhabotosh Sutar who won two awards for Naktala Udayan Sangha in 2011 and for Suruchi Sangha in 2019. Behala Adarshapally won both the categories of Best Puja and Best Artisan in 2005.
Special Award(Bisesh Shamman)

the special jury award on overall excellence.

The Award
The statuette given for Asian Paints Sharad Shamman looks like a conch shell. It is a small silver structure(previously gold) which is situated on a pedestal. This is enclosed in a glass box and handed over to the winners along with a cheque. Variations include for the statuette for "Creative Excellence" award. This includes a statue of an earthen pot with the traditional coconut and mango leaves on it. This is also made of silver.From 2016, the design of the prestigious Asian Paints Sharad Samman statuette has been modified making it more attractive and glowing. It now looks like a lotus with a stand holding it with a pedestal which is enclosed in a glass box. The height of the statuette has been enhanced as compared to the previous one.

Asian Paints Logo and slogan
For Asian Paints Sharad Shamman, a logo of a young boy playing the dhak(drum) is shown. Also among the logos are a face of Maa Durga in monochrome line drawing, little kids playing with balloons etc.

The slogan for the award is "Shuddha suchi, sustha ruchi'r sera bachai" which means "The best from the artistically efficient and culturally significant", as described by the late poet Shri Subhash Mukhopadhay. From that point this has been the main slogan for the award.

Judges and judgement
The judges for the award are chosen from a who's who of the Begali Literati and include artists, art critics, writers, actors, politicians, models, singers, poets etc. Notable among those chosen over the years are artist Shuvaprasanna, actors Sabyasachi, Moon Moon Sen, magician P.C. Sorcar, vocalist Bratati etc. Puja pandals are requested to submit their application by the 3rd day of the Puja. The judges go around the town on the fifth and sixth day and visit all the different Puja pandals. On the seventh day 12 finalists are short-listed and their names are declared. Finally, on the evening of the eighth day, the winners in the different categories are declared and are handed over with their trophies.

List of winners
The following is the list of winners and their artists for Asian Paints Sharad Shamman from the past 34 years.

Most wins:The collective most wins are by the following Pujas:

New Alipore Suruchi Sangha (12)
Naktala Udayan Sangha (7)
Barisha Club (7) *
Nalin Sarkar Street (6)
Adi Ballygunge (5)
Tala Park Pratyay (4)
Mudiali (4)
Behala Adarshapally (4)
Shibmandir Sarbojanin Durgotsab Samiti (4)
Behala Natun Dal (4)
State Bank Park Sarbojanin Durgotsob (4)
Laketown Natunpally Pradeep Sangha (3)
Tala Barowari (3)
Sunilnagar (3)
Telengabagan Sarbojanin (3)
Haridevpur Ajeya Sanghati (3)
Pathuriaghata 5er Pally (3)
Karbagan (3)
Chakraberia Sarbojanin (3)
Kidderpore Pally Saradiya (3)
Hatibagan Sarbojanin (3)
Kashi Bose Lane (3)
Arjunpur Amra Sabai Club (3)
Chetla Agrani Club (3)

Among the artisans Sanatan Dinda leads with five wins, one for Hatibagan Sarbojanin, another for Barisha Club and three for Nalin Sarkar Street.

Amar Sarkar has 3 wins for Ajeya Sanghati
 Barisha Club's collective win is 7. This club is a merge of the former clubs Shrishti and Sahajatri. Sahajatri won one award in 1998 and Shrishti won two awards in 2001 and 2004. Hence together with these awards and the award for 2008, 2010 and 2012 ,2020
 Among the asian paints sharad samman winners (see the above list "Most wins") Laketown Natunpally Pradeep Sangha is the first puja committee who had win the prestigious durga puja award for consecutive three years (2006, 2007 and 2008). In 2009 they were selected for the final round of this award and almost won the award for the fourth time. This rare record was unbroken till 2013, when Kolkata's two puja committees naming "Suruchi Sangha" and "Naktala Udayan Sangha".

References

External links
 Official Asian Paints Sharad Shamman site

Durga Puja
Culture of West Bengal
Indian awards
Awards established in 1985
Culture of Kolkata
1985 establishments in West Bengal